Geremy Tinker is a wheelchair rugby player from New Zealand, and a member of the national team, the Wheel Blacks.

Geremy was a part of the wheel blacks at the first four Paralympic games wheelchair rugby tournaments from its beginnings in 1996 as a demonstration event through to the 2008 Summer Paralympics.  In that time he has won a gold medal in 2004 and a bronze in 2000

References

External links 
 
 

Paralympic wheelchair rugby players of New Zealand
Wheelchair rugby players at the 1996 Summer Paralympics
Wheelchair rugby players at the 2000 Summer Paralympics
Wheelchair rugby players at the 2004 Summer Paralympics
Wheelchair rugby players at the 2008 Summer Paralympics
Paralympic gold medalists for New Zealand
Paralympic bronze medalists for New Zealand
Living people
Medalists at the 1996 Summer Paralympics
Medalists at the 2000 Summer Paralympics
Medalists at the 2004 Summer Paralympics
Year of birth missing (living people)
Paralympic medalists in wheelchair rugby